John William Kime (15 July 1934 – 14 September 2006) was an admiral of the United States Coast Guard who served as the 19th commandant from 1990 to 1994.

Early life and career

Kime was born in Greensboro, North Carolina. At the age of 10, he moved with his family to Baltimore, Maryland. In 1951, he graduated from Baltimore City College, and was accepted into the School of Pharmacy at the University of Maryland, but declined the admission offer for financial reasons.

Soon thereafter, he accepted a job at the local General Motors plant, installing glove boxes in Chevrolets. The following year, he saw a television advertisement on Coast Guard careers, which inspired him to enroll at the United States Coast Guard Academy in New London, Connecticut.

In 1957, Kime graduated second in his academy class. Upon graduation, he served aboard  before assuming command of LORAN Station Wake Island in 1960. Continuing his education, he graduated from the Massachusetts Institute of Technology with a master's degree in naval architecture and marine engineering and the professional degree of naval engineer in 1964. In 1977, he became a distinguished graduate of the Industrial College of the Armed Forces and was assigned to headquarters as assistant chief of the Merchant Marine Technical Division. His other assignments included command of Marine Safety Office Baltimore in 1978–81, deputy chief of the Office of Marine Environment and Systems, 1981–82; chief of the Seventh Coast Guard District Operations Division, 1982–84; chief of Headquarters Office of Marine Safety, Security, and Environmental Protection, 1986–1988.

Prior to becoming Coast Guard commandant, he served as commander of the Long Beach, California-based 11th Coast Guard District and Pacific Regional Coordinator for the Office of National Drug Control Policy.  It is noteworthy that Kime was promoted from rear admiral (a two-star rank) to admiral (a four-star rank), never having held the three-star rank of vice admiral.

Commandant
As commandant, Kime was passionate about maritime safety and environmental protection issues, and oversaw implementation of the landmark Oil Pollution Act of 1990, and established the position of Drug Interdiction Coordinator.  In the wake of the Exxon Valdez oil spill, he pioneered how the Coast Guard prevents and responds to oil and hazardous chemical spills, significantly minimizing environmental damage. The groundwork he laid can also be seen in how the Coast Guard responds to a broad range of threats and hazards to maritime, homeland, and national security interests. His vision set the stage for the Coast Guard's transition to focused organizational competencies in prevention and response. He led the service during the end of the Cold War, collapse of communism, Operation Desert Shield and Operation Desert Storm, as well as increasing operations in traditional mission areas.

Later life
Upon his retirement from the Coast Guard in 1994, Kime brought his leadership to the maritime industry, serving as the chief executive officer of management companies in the United States, United Kingdom, Norway and Sweden. Until 2005, he served as the U.S. representative to the Baltic and International Maritime Council (BIMCO), the world's largest private shipping organization.

He died of cancer in Towson, Maryland, on 14 September 2006 at age 72.  A memorial service was held at the Fort Myer Memorial Chapel in Arlington, Virginia, on 29 September followed by interment in Arlington National Cemetery on Coast Guard Hill.

Sources: ALCOAST 464/06 (R 142239Z SEP
06), ALCOAST 469/06 06 (R 152010Z SEP
06), ALCOAST 475/06 (R 202141Z SEP 06),
and L.A. Times obituaries, September 20, 2006.

Awards and decorations
Kime received the following awards and decorations: 
Transportation Distinguished Service Medal
Coast Guard Distinguished Service Medal
Defense Superior Service Medal
Legion of Merit
Meritorious Service Medals with "O" device with four gold Award stars
Coast Guard Commendation Medal
Coast Guard Achievement Medal
Commandant's Letter of Commendation Ribbons with "O" device with two gold Award stars
Coast Guard Unit Commendation with "O" device one gold Award star
Coast Guard Meritorious Unit Commendation
International Maritime Prize

References

External links

United States Coast Guard Biography

1934 births
2006 deaths
Commandants of the United States Coast Guard
United States Coast Guard admirals
Office of National Drug Control Policy officials
Recipients of the Defense Superior Service Medal
Recipients of the Legion of Merit
Recipients of the Coast Guard Distinguished Service Medal
Recipients of the Transportation Distinguished Service Medal
People from Greensboro, North Carolina
Military personnel from North Carolina
Military personnel from Baltimore
Massachusetts Institute of Technology alumni
United States Coast Guard Academy alumni
Baltimore City College alumni
Burials at Arlington National Cemetery
Deaths from cancer in Maryland